H. rubra  may refer to:
 Haliotis rubra, the blacklip abalone, a large edible sea snail species
 Halocaridina rubra, the ōpae ula in Hawaiian, a small shrimp species
 Hypotrix rubra, a moth species found from south-western New Mexico and south-eastern Arizona
 Hyunsoonleella rubra, a marine bacterium

See also
 Rubra (disambiguation)